The U.S. District Court for the Northern District of Ohio (in case citations, N.D. Ohio) is the federal trial court for the northern half of Ohio–essentially everything north of the Columbus area. The court has courthouses in Cleveland, Toledo, Akron and Youngstown.

Appeals from this court are heard by the United States Court of Appeals for the Sixth Circuit (except for patent claims and claims against the U.S. government under the Tucker Act, which are appealed to the Federal Circuit).

The United States Attorney's Office of the Northern District of Ohio represents the United States in civil and criminal litigation in the court.  the Acting United States Attorney, the district’s chief prosecutor, is Michelle M. Baeppler.

History 

Divisions 
The Northern District comprises two divisions.

Eastern Division
The Eastern Division comprises the counties of Ashland, Ashtabula, Carroll, Columbiana, Crawford, Cuyahoga, Geauga, Holmes, Lake, Lorain, Mahoning, Medina, Portage, Richland, Stark, Summit, Trumbull, Tuscarawas and Wayne.

Court for the Eastern Division can be held in Akron, Cleveland and Youngstown.

Western Division
The Western Division comprises the counties of Allen, Auglaize, Defiance, Erie, Fulton, Hancock, Hardin, Henry, Huron, Lucas, Marion, Mercer, Ottawa, Paulding, Putnam, Sandusky, Seneca, Van Wert, Williams, Wood and Wyandot.

Court for the Western Division can be held in Toledo.

Current judges 

:

Former judges

Chief judges

Succession of seats

See also 

 Courts of Ohio
 List of current United States district judges
 List of United States federal courthouses in Ohio

References

External links 
 United States District Court for the Northern District of Ohio

Ohio, Northern
Ohio law
Cleveland
Toledo, Ohio
Akron, Ohio
Youngstown, Ohio
Courthouses in Ohio
1855 establishments in Ohio
Courts and tribunals established in 1855